The seven-banded wrasse (Thalassoma septemfasciata) is a species of ray-finned fish, a wrasse from the family Labridae which is endemic to the Indian Ocean waters of Western Australia.  This species is known to occur on reefs in areas with plentiful rocks and weeds.  It can reach  in total length.

References

Seven-banded wrasse
Fish described in 1959
Taxobox binomials not recognized by IUCN